North East Hampshire is a constituency represented in the House of Commons of the UK Parliament by Ranil Jayawardena, a Conservative who  served as Environment Secretary for seven weeks in 2022.

History
The constituency was created in 1997 from parts of the seats of Aldershot and East Hampshire. It was represented at Westminster by James Arbuthnot until 2015 when he was succeeded by Ranil Jayawardena. The constituency has, since its creation, given large majorities to the Conservatives, and in 2015, Jayawardena was elected with a lead of 29,916 votes, or 55.4%. This made North East Hampshire the safest Conservative seat at that election in both percentage and numerical terms.

Boundaries

1997–2010: The District of Hart wards of Church Crookham, Crondall, Eversley, Fleet Courtmoor, Fleet Pondtail, Fleet West, Hartley Wintney, Hook, Long Sutton, Odiham, and Whitewater, and the District of East Hampshire wards of Binsted, Bramshott and Liphook, Froyle and Bentley, Grayshott, Headley, Selborne, Whitehill Bordon and Whitehill, and Whitehill Lindford.

2010–present: The District of Hart wards of Church Crookham East, Church Crookham West, Crondall, Eversley, Fleet Central, Fleet Courtmoor, Fleet North, Fleet Pondtail, Fleet West, Greywell, Hartley Wintney, Hook, Long Sutton, Odiham, Yateley East, Yateley North, and Yateley West, and the Borough of Basingstoke and Deane wards of Calleva, Pamber, Sherborne St John, and Upton Grey and The Candovers.

Towns and villages in the constituency include Elvetham Heath, Eversley, Fleet, Greywell, Hartley Wintney, Headley, Herriard, Hook, Odiham, Sherfield on Loddon, Silchester and Yateley.

This constituency was slightly altered for the 2010 general election. The seat's southernmost part was transferred to East Hampshire while it gained some wards from Basingstoke and Hart wards from Aldershot.

Constituency profile
The seat includes significant software, hardware and military sectors and a significant proportion of Basingstoke, Bracknell and City of London commuters, particularly the latter towards Hook railway station on the South West Main Line; the average income level is higher than the national average.  This area also has low unemployment and a high proportion of semi-detached and detached properties.

Members of Parliament

Elections

Elections in the 1990s

Elections in the 2000s

Elections in the 2010s

1: After nominations were closed, Blay was suspended from UKIP after threatening to shoot his Conservative opponent. His name still appeared on ballot papers as it was too late to remove him.

 
 -->

-->

See also
List of parliamentary constituencies in Hampshire

Notes

References

Sources
Election result, 2005 (BBC)
Election results, 1997 - 2001 (BBC)
Election results, 1997 - 2001 (Election Demon)
Election results, 1997 - 2005 (Guardian)

Parliamentary constituencies in Hampshire
Constituencies of the Parliament of the United Kingdom established in 1997